Pohjannaula was a Finnish folk rock music band formed in 1998. The band was split up in February 2011.

Band members

Samuli Mäkisalo – vocals and guitar
Juha-Matti Pesonen – guitar
Tomi Rikkola – viola 
Tuomo Kuure – bass
Hermanni Peltola – drums

Former members
Juha Menna – drums
Antero Aunesluoma – bass

Releases

Albums
 1998: Kivi
 2000: Pässinpää
 2002: Päreinä 
 2005: Tätä kaikki kaipaa

Singles and EPs
1998: Halajan
1998: Kun juoksu loppuu / Pirunpelto
2000: Veistäjä / Sielulintu
2000: Jääkannel
2001: Liekki
2002: Kuljettu matka
2005: Ei ole tapana
2005: Lumottu yö / Pinnan alla

External links
 pohjannaula.net – official site

Finnish musical groups